The EF-M 32mm f/1.4 STM is an interchangeable prime lens introduced by Canon in September 2018. The lens is based on the EF-M mount that is used in Canon's lineup of mirrorless cameras. It currently is the latest lens published that uses the EF-M lens mount.

With a maximum value of f/1.4, it has the largest aperture of all Canon EF-M mount lenses.

Gallery

Weblinks 

 Official webpage of the EF-M 32mm f/1.4 STM

References 

Canon EF-M-mount lenses
Camera lenses introduced in 2018